William B. Kaplan is an American sound engineer. He has over 125 credits to his name and has been nominated for seven Academy Awards in the category Best Sound. He has worked on over 80 films since 1972.

Selected filmography
 Back to the Future (1985)
 Top Gun (1986)
 Forrest Gump (1994)
 Crimson Tide (1995)
 Contact (1997)
 Cast Away (2000)
 The Polar Express (2004)

Awards
In 2020, Kaplan was honored by the Cinema Audio Society with its highest accolade, a Career Achievement Award.

Kaplan previously won the Cinema Audio Society Award for his work on "Forrest Gump" and received three other CAS nominations for his work on "Crimson Tide (film), "Cast Away" and "The Contact (1963 film)."

References

External links
 

Year of birth missing (living people)
Living people
American audio engineers